Stockton-on-the-Forest is a village and civil parish in the unitary authority of the City of York in North Yorkshire, England.

History
The village is mentioned in the Domesday Book as Stocthun in the Bulford hundred. After the Norman invasion the land was shared between Count Alan (of Brittany) and Canons of York (St Peter).

The village is home to Stockton Hall, once owned by Hall Plumer, esq in 1820 and built  as a country house. It is now a secure unit for mentally ill patients operated by the Priory Group. The hall is a brick built three-storey building with a five-bay frontage and is grade II listed. It was acquired by barrister George Lloyd of Leeds, from whom it passed to his daughter Miss Alicia Maria Lloyd. She left it in 1892 to her nephew George William Lloyd.

The village was historically part of the North Riding of Yorkshire until 1974. It was then a part of the district of Ryedale in North Yorkshire from 1974 until 1996. Since 1996 it has been part of the City of York unitary authority.

Governance
The village lies within the York Outer UK Parliament constituency. It also lies within the Strensall electoral ward of City of York Council.

Geography

Stockton-on-the-Forest is located to the east of the A64 road to Scarborough and the roundabout interchange of the A64 and the A1036. To the east there are the villages of Upper Helmsley and Sand Hutton and to the south the villages of Warthill, Holtby and Murton.

According to the 2001 census the parish had a population of 1,261, reducing to 1,214 at the 2011 Census.

Many of the houses along the main road do not have house numbers but individual names many with references to agriculture, local features or mysticism.

Religion
Stockton-on-the-Forest is served by one church, the Anglican Holy Trinity Church that was rebuilt in 1843. In 2012 the churches of Stockton-on-the-Forest, Holtby and Warthill joined with Dunnington church to form Rural East York. The Methodist Chapel was closed in May 2010 and subsequently demolished to make way for residential property.

Amenities
The village has a local pub, called The Fox. A Scout group has operated in the village since 2000, consisting of a Beaver Colony, Cub Pack and Scout Troop. The village also has a village hall and a post office and local shop. A GP surgery with limited opening hours is present to serve the village for minor healthcare needs.

Forest Park Golf Club stretches between the village and the A64 road. The Snowball Plantation woodland area and Scout park is situated on the eastern end of the village.

Education
Stockton-on-the-Forest has a primary school for local residents accommodating approximately 100 pupils. The village lies within the catchment area of Huntington School, a secondary school located in nearby Huntington.

Transport
Stockton-on-the-Forest is currently served by bus operator Coastliner that links the village with the cities of Leeds and York as well as the east coast of Yorkshire via Malton. The A64 is located nearby, a major connecting road in the region. The village was served by Warthill railway station on the York to Beverley Line between 1847 and 1959.

References

External links

 Stockton on the Forest & Hopgrove Community Website
 Stockton Hall website
 Stockton-on-the-Forest Primary School website
 

Villages in the City of York
Civil parishes in North Yorkshire